A Proth number is a natural number N of the form  where k and n are positive integers, k is odd and . A Proth prime is a Proth number that is prime. They are named after the French mathematician François Proth.  The first few Proth primes are 

 3, 5, 13, 17, 41, 97, 113, 193, 241, 257, 353, 449, 577, 641, 673, 769, 929, 1153, 1217, 1409, 1601, 2113, 2689, 2753, 3137, 3329, 3457, 4481, 4993, 6529, 7297, 7681, 7937, 9473, 9601, 9857.

It is still an open question whether an infinite number of Proth primes exist. It was shown in 2022 that the reciprocal sum of Proth primes converges to a real number near 0.747392479, substantially less than the value of 1.093322456 for the reciprocal sum of Proth numbers.

The primality of Proth numbers can be tested more easily than many other numbers of similar magnitude.

Definition 
A Proth prime is a Proth number that is prime. Without the condition that , all odd integers larger than 1 would be Proth numbers.

Primality testing 

The primality of a Proth number can be tested with Proth's theorem, which states that a Proth number  is prime if and only if there exists an integer  for which 

This theorem can be used as a probabilistic test of primality, by checking for many random choices of  whether   If this fails to hold for several random , then it is very likely that the number  is composite.
This test is a Las Vegas algorithm: it never returns a false positive but can return a false negative; in other words, it never reports a composite number as "probably prime" but can report a prime number as "possibly composite".

In 2008, Sze created a deterministic algorithm that runs in at most  time, where Õ is the soft-O notation. For typical searches for Proth primes, usually  is either fixed (e.g. 321 Prime Search or Sierpinski Problem) or of order  (e.g. Cullen prime search). In these cases algorithm runs in at most , or  time for all . There is also an algorithm that runs in  time.

Large primes 
It is 9,383,761 digits long. It was found by Szabolcs Peter in the PrimeGrid volunteer computing project which announced it on 6 November 2016. It is also the largest known non-Mersenne prime.

The project Seventeen or Bust, searching for Proth primes with a certain  to prove that 78557 is the smallest Sierpinski number (Sierpinski problem), has found 11 large Proth primes by 2007. Similar resolutions to the prime Sierpiński problem and extended Sierpiński problem have yielded several more numbers.

Since divisors of Fermat numbers  are always of the form , it is customary to determine if a new Proth prime divides a Fermat number.

As of June 2022, PrimeGrid is the leading computing project for searching for Proth primes. Its main projects include:

 general Proth prime search
 321 Prime Search (searching for primes of the form , also called Thabit primes of the second kind)
 27121 Prime Search (searching for primes of the form  and )
 Cullen prime search (searching for primes of the form )
Sierpinski problem (and their prime and extended generalizations) – searching for primes of the form  where k is in this list:
k ∈ {21181, 22699, 24737, 55459, 67607, 79309, 79817, 91549, 99739, 131179, 152267, 156511, 163187, 200749, 209611, 222113, 225931, 227723, 229673, 237019, 238411}

As of December 2022, the largest Proth primes discovered are:

Uses 
Small Proth primes (less than 10200) have been used in constructing prime ladders, sequences of prime numbers such that each term is "close" (within about 1011) to the previous one.  Such ladders have been used to empirically verify prime-related conjectures.  For example, Goldbach's weak conjecture was verified in 2008 up to 8.875 × 1030 using prime ladders constructed from Proth primes.  (The conjecture was later proved by Harald Helfgott.)

Also, Proth primes can optimize den Boer reduction between the Diffie-Hellman problem and the Discrete logarithm problem. The prime number 55 × 2286 + 1 has been used in this way.

As Proth primes have simple binary representations, they have also been used in fast modular reduction without the need for pre-computation, for example by Microsoft.

References 

Classes of prime numbers